The population of Turkey includes various significant minority ethnic groups. No exact data is available concerning the different ethnic groups in Turkey. The last census data according to language date from 1965 and major changes may have occurred since then. However, it is clear that the Turkish are in the majority, while the largest minority groups are Kurds and Arabs. Smaller minorities are the Armenians, Greeks and others. All ethnic groups are discussed below.

Demographic trends in modern history of Turkey

Demographics 
The word Turk or Turkish also has a wider meaning in a historical context because, at times, especially in the past, it has been used to refer to all Muslim inhabitants of the Ottoman Empire irrespective of their ethnicity.

A possible list of ethnic groups living in Turkey could be as follows:

 Turkic-speaking peoples: Turks, Azerbaijanis, Tatars, Karachays, Uzbeks, Crimean Tatars and Uyghurs
 Indo-European-speaking peoples: Kurds, Zazas, Megleno-Romanians, Bosniaks, Albanians, Pomaks, Ossetians, Armenians, Hamshenis, Goranis and Greeks
 Semitic-speaking peoples: Arabs, Jews and Assyrians/Syriacs
 Caucasian-speaking peoples: Circassians,Abkhazians, Georgians, Lazs and Chechens

According to the 2016 edition of the CIA World Factbook, 70–75% of Turkey's population consists of ethnic Turks, with Kurds accounting for 19% and other minorities between 6 and 11%.
According to Milliyet, a 2008 report prepared for the National Security Council of Turkey by academics of three Turkish universities in eastern Anatolia suggested that there are approximately 55 million ethnic Turks, 9.6 million Kurds, 3 million Zazas, 2.5 million Circassians, 2 million Bosniaks, 500,000–1.3 million Albanians, 1,000,000 Georgians, 870,000 Arabs, 600,000 Pomaks, 80,000 Laz, 60,000 Armenians, 30,000 British, 25,000 Assyrians/Syriacs, 20,000 Jews, and 15,000 Greeks, 500 Yazidis living in Turkey.

According to a survey published in 2022 by Konda Research, Turks make up 77% of the population, while 19% self-identify as Kurd. Arabs (Syrian refugees excluded) make up 2%, and other ethnic groups are 2% of the population.

Since the immigration to the big cities in the west of Turkey, interethnic marriage has become more common. A recent study estimates that there are 2,708,000 marriages between Turks and Kurds.

According to a survey done in March 2020 by Area Araştırma, 20.4% of the total population of Turkey claim to be Kurdish (either Kurmanji speaking or Zazaki speaking).

Ethnolinguistic estimates in 2014 by Ethnologue and Jacques Leclerc:

Scale of Ethnologue:

aExpanded Graded Intergenerational Disruption Scale (EGIDS) of Ethnologue:
0 (International): "The language is widely used between nations in trade, knowledge exchange, and international policy."
1 (National): "The language is used in education, work, mass media, and government at the national level."
2 (Provincial): "The language is used in education, work, mass media, and government within major administrative subdivisions of a nation."
3 (Wider Communication): "The language is used in work and mass media without official status to transcend language differences across a region."
4 (Educational): "The language is in vigorous use, with standardization and literature being sustained through a widespread system of institutionally supported education."
5 (Developing): "The language is in vigorous use, with literature in a standardized form being used by some though this is not yet widespread or sustainable."
6a (Vigorous): "The language is used for face-to-face communication by all generations and the situation is sustainable."
6b (Threatened): "The language is used for face-to-face communication within all generations, but it is losing users."
7 (Shifting): "The child-bearing generation can use the language among themselves, but it is not being transmitted to children."
8a (Moribund): "The only remaining active users of the language are members of the grandparent generation and older."
8b (Nearly Extinct): "The only remaining users of the language are members of the grandparent generation or older who have little opportunity to use the language."
9 (Dormant): "The language serves as a reminder of heritage identity for an ethnic community, but no one has more than symbolic proficiency."
10 (Extinct): "The language is no longer used and no one retains a sense of ethnic identity associated with the language."

Turks 

Although numerous modern genetic studies have indicated that the present-day Turkish population is primarily descended from historical native Anatolian groups, the first Turkic-speaking people lived in a region extending from Central Asia to Siberia and were palpable after the 6th century BC. Seventh-century Chinese sources preserve the origins of the Turks stating that they were a branch of the Hsiung-nu (Huns) and living near the "West Sea", perhaps the Caspian Sea. Modern sources tends to indicate that the Turks' linguistic and cultural ancestors lived within the state of the Hsiung-nu in the Transbaikal area and that they later, during the fifth century, migrated to the southern Altay.

The word Türk was used only referring to Anatolian villagers back in the 19th century. The Ottoman elite identified themselves as specifically Ottomans, not usually as any Turks. In the late 19th century, as European ideas of nationalism were adopted by the Ottoman elite, and as it became clear that the Turkish-speakers of Anatolia were the most loyal supporters of Ottoman rule, the term Türk took on a much more positive connotation. During Ottoman times, the millet system defined communities on a religious basis, and a residue of this remains in that Turkish villagers will commonly consider as Turks only those who profess the Sunni faith, and will consider Turkish-speaking Jews, Christians, or even Alevis to be non-Turks. On the other hand, Kurdish-speaking or Arabic-speaking Sunnis of eastern Anatolia are sometimes considered to be Turks. The imprecision of the appellation Türk can also be seen with other ethnic names, such as Kürt (Kurd), which is often applied by western Anatolians to anyone east of Adana, even those who speak only Turkish. Thus, the category Türk, like other ethnic categories popularly used in Turkey, does not have a uniform usage. In recent years, centrist Turkish politicians have attempted to redefine this category in a more multi-cultural way, emphasizing that a Türk is anyone who is a citizen of the Republic of Turkey. Currently, article 66 of the Turkish Constitution defines a "Turk" as anyone who is "bound to the Turkish state through the bond of citizenship".

Those who identify themselves as Turks are the majority in Turkey, numbering 65 to 70 million.

Kurds 

The Kurdish identity remains the strongest minority in modern Turkey. This is perhaps due to the mountainous terrain of the southeast of the country, where they mostly predominate and represent a majority. They inhabit all major towns and cities across eastern Turkey. However, no accurate up-to-date figures are available for the Kurdish population, since the Turkish government has outlawed ethnic or racial censuses. An estimate by the CIA World Factbook places their proportion of the population at approximately 19%. Another estimate, according to Ibrahim Sirkeci, in his book The Environment of Insecurity in Turkey and the Emigration of Turkish Kurds to Germany, based on the 1990 Turkish Census and 1993 Turkish Demographic Health Survey, is 17.8%. Other estimates include 15.7% of the population according to the newspaper Milliyet, and 23% by Kurdologist David McDowall.

The Minority Rights Group report of 1985 by (Martin Short and Anthony McDermott) gave an estimate of 15% Kurds in the population of Turkey in 1980, i.e. 8,455,000 out of 44,500,000, with the preceding comment "Nothing, apart from the actual 'borders' of Kurdistan, generates as much heat in the Kurdish question as the estimate of the Kurdish population. Kurdish nationalists are tempted to exaggerate it, and governments of the region to understate it. In Turkey, only those Kurds who do not speak Turkish are officially counted for census purposes as Kurds, ostansibly yielding a comparatively low figure.

Arabs 

The population of Arabs in Turkey varies according to different sources. Al Jazeera and the Washington Institute for Near East Policy estimates the Arab population before the Syrian Civil War in 2011 from 1,500,000 to more than 2,000,000, with recent Syrian refugees 2,748,367, so Arabs in Turkey constituency now numbers anywhere from 4.5 to 5.1% of the population. Put another way, with nearly 4–5 million Arab inhabitants.

In a 2020 interview with Al Jazeera, the prominent Turco-Arab politician Yasin Aktay estimated the number of Arabs in Turkey at nine million (or 10% of Turkey's population), half of them from other countries.

Zazas

Zazas, are a people in eastern Anatolia who natively speak the Zaza language. Their heartland, the Dersim region, consists of Tunceli, Bingöl provinces and parts of Elazığ, Erzincan and Diyarbakır provinces. The exact number of Zazas is unknown, due to the absence of recent and extensive census data. The most recent official statistics concerning native language are available for the year 1965, where 147,707 (0.5%) chose Zaza as their native language in Turkey.

Bosniaks

Georgians 

There are approximately 1 million people of Georgian ancestry in Turkey, according to the newspaper Milliyet.

Roma people 

The Roma in Turkey descend from the times of the Byzantine Empire. According to some reports, there are about 500,000–700,000 Roma in Turkey. The neighborhood of Sulukule, located in Western Istanbul, is the oldest Roma settlement in Europe.

Iranians 

Shireen Hunter noted in a 2010 publication that there were some 500,000 Iranians in Turkey.

Laz 

Most Laz today live in Turkey, but the Laz minority group has no official status in Turkey. Their number today is estimated to be around 250,000 and 500,000. Only a minority are bilingual in Turkish and their native Laz language which belongs to the South Caucasian group. The number of the Laz speakers is decreasing and is now limited chiefly to the Rize and Artvin areas. The historical term Lazistan — formerly referring to a narrow tract of land along the Black Sea inhabited by the Laz as well as by several other ethnic groups — has been banned from official use and replaced with Doğu Karadeniz (which includes Trabzon). During the Russo-Turkish War of 1877–1878, the Muslim population of Russia near the war zones was subjected to ethnic cleansing; many Lazes living in Batum fled to the Ottoman Empire, settling along the southern Black Sea coast to the east of Samsun.

Azerbaijanis 

It is difficult to determine how many ethnic Azeris currently reside in Turkey, as ethnicity is a rather fluid concept in Turkey, especially amongst Turkic-speaking and Caucasian groups who have been more readily and easily assimilated into mainstream Turkish culture. Up to 300,000 of Azeris who reside in Turkey are citizens of Azerbaijan. In the Eastern Anatolia Region, Azeris are sometimes referred to as acem (see Ajam) or tat. They currently are the largest ethnic group in the city of Iğdır and second largest ethnic group in Kars.

Since linguistically the two are so similar, the safest way to count or estimate the number of Azeris from the Turks in Turkey is to note the fact that Azeris are practically all Shia Muslims while their Turkish and Kurdish neighbors are Sunni Muslims.

Circassians 

Towards the end of the Russo-Circassian War (1763–1864), many Circassians fled their homelands in the North Caucasus and settled in the Ottoman Empire. Most ethnic Circassians have fully assimilated into Turkish culture, making it difficult to trace, count, or even estimate their ethnic presence.

Armenians 

Armenians in Turkey are indigenous to Anatolia & Armenian highlands well over 3000 years, an estimated population of 40,000 (1995) to 70,000. Most are concentrated around Istanbul. The Armenians support their own newspapers and schools. The majority belong to the Armenian Apostolic faith, with smaller numbers of Armenian Catholics and Armenian Evangelicals. Their original population during the dying days of the Ottoman Empire was counted to be 1.2–1.8 million. The majority of Armenians had lived in the Ottoman-controlled portion of the Armenian Highlands, the modern day Eastern Anatolia Region, until 1.5 million were killed and the rest deported during the Armenian genocide between 1915 and 1923.

Albanians

Assyrians/Syriacs 

An estimated 40,000–50,000 Assyrians/Syriacs live in Turkey, with about 17,000 in Istanbul and the other 23–33,000 scattered in southeast Turkey primarily in Turabdin, Diyarbakir, Adiyaman, and Harput respectively. They belong to the Syriac Orthodox Church, Syriac Catholic Church, and Chaldean Catholic Church.
Some Mhallami, a Muslim ethnic group who usually are described as Arabs, have Assyrian/Syriac ancestry. They live in the area between Mardin and Midyat, called in Syriac "I Mhalmayto" (ܗܝ ܡܚܠܡܝܬܐ).

Chechens 

Towards the end of the Caucasian War (1817–1864), many Chechens fled their homelands in the North Caucasus and settled in the Ottoman Empire. Chechens number from tens or hundreds of thousands.

Greeks 

The Greeks constitute a population of Greek and Greek-speaking Eastern Orthodox Christians who mostly live in Istanbul, including its district Princes' Islands, as well as on the two islands of the western entrance to the Dardanelles: Imbros and Tenedos ( and Bozcaada), and historically also in western Asia Minor (centred on Izmir/Smyrni), the Pontic Alps (centred on Trebzon and Sumelia, see Pontic Greeks), and central Anatolia (Cappadocia) and northeastern Anatolia and the South Caucasus region (Erzinjan, Erzerum, Kars, and Ardahan, see Caucasus Greeks). The Istanbul Greeks are the remnants of the estimated 200,000 Greeks permitted under the provisions of the Treaty of Lausanne (1923) to remain in Turkey following the 1923 population exchange, which involved the forcible resettlement of approximately 1.5 million Greeks from Anatolia and East Thrace and of half a million Turks from all of Greece except for Western Thrace. After years of persecution (e.g. the Varlık Vergisi (1942–1944) and the Istanbul Pogrom of 1955), emigration of ethnic Greeks from the Istanbul region greatly accelerated, reducing the 120,000-strong Greek minority to about 7,000 by 1978. The 2008 figures released by the Turkish Foreign Ministry places the current number of Turkish citizens of Greek descent at the 2,000–3,000 mark. According to Milliyet there are 15,000 Greeks in Turkey, while according to Human Rights Watch the Greek population in Turkey was estimated at 2,500 in 2006.

Megleno-Romanians 
Around 5,000 Megleno-Romanians live in Turkey.

References 

Ethnic groups in Turkey